Bartholomeus Barbiers (11 January 1743 (bapt) – 1808) was a Dutch painter in the 18th century. He was born and died in Amsterdam, the son and pupil of Pieter Barbiers. He was skilful at landscapes, and painted with the left hand.

His brother Pieter Pietersz Barbiers and his son Pieter Bartholomeusz Barbiers were also painters.

References

1743 births
1808 deaths
18th-century Dutch painters
18th-century Dutch male artists
Dutch male painters
Painters from Amsterdam